William Jelani Cobb (born August 21, 1969) is an American writer, author, educator, and dean of the Columbia Journalism School.

Before joining Columbia University as the Ira A. Lipman Professor of Journalism in 2016, Cobb was an associate professor of history and director of the Institute for African American Studies at the University of Connecticut from 2012 to 2016. Since 2015, he has been a staff writer at The New Yorker.

Early life
William Jelani Cobb was born in Queens, New York, on August 21, 1969, the youngest of four children. Both of Cobb's parents had migrated from the American south, where they did not have access to high-quality schools. As a result, they were determined to give reading and learning important places in their family life. Cobb counted being taught to write at an early age by his father, Willie Lee Cobb—an electrician with a third-grade education—among his earliest memories. On his website, Cobb described his father's "huge hand engulfing mine as he showed me how to scrawl the alphabet."

Cobb attended Jamaica High School followed by Howard University in Washington, D.C., where it took him seven years to complete his undergraduate degree because he did not consistently have the funds to pay tuition. At Rutgers University, he received a PhD in American history in May 2003 under the supervision of David Levering Lewis.

Career
Cobb has received fellowships from the Fulbright and Ford Foundations.

While studying at Howard, Cobb began his professional writing career, first publishing at a short-lived periodical called One. In time, he began contributing to the Washington City Paper. His first national outlet was YSB magazine, part of the Black Entertainment Television, Inc. media empire, beginning in 1993. He also became more politically active during this time, and was involved with an organization that took over Howard's administration building in 1989. It was around this time that Cobb, seeking to connect more with African tradition, decided to add "Jelani"—a word meaning "powerful"—to his name.

Cobb specializes in post-Civil War African-American history, 20th-century American politics, and the history of the Cold War. He served as a delegate and historian for the 5th Congressional District of Georgia at the 2008 Democratic National Convention. He previously taught at Rutgers and Spelman College.

In an August 2022 interview with Politico Magazine, Cobb, discussing his goals as dean of the Columbia Journalism School, said he wanted to help "make the [journalism] field itself more democratic. I don’t have any illusions about how complicated that undertaking will be."

Publications
Cobb's books include The Substance of Hope: Barack Obama and the Paradox of Progress (Walker, 2010) and To the Break of Dawn: A Freestyle on the Hip Hop Aesthetic (2007), which was a finalist for the 2007 National Award for Arts Writing of the Arts Club of Washington. His collection The Devil & Dave Chappelle and Other Essays was published the same year. Cobb has contributed to a number of anthologies, including In Defense of Mumia, Testimony, Mending the World and Beats, Rhymes and Life, and his articles and essays have appeared in The Washington Post, The New Yorker, Essence, Vibe, Emerge, The Progressive, The Washington City Paper, One Magazine, Ebony and TheRoot.com. He has also been a featured commentator on National Public Radio, CNN, Al-Jazeera, CBS News, and other national broadcast outlets.

While doing research at the New York University library, Cobb stumbled upon a cache of previously unpublished writings by Harold Cruse, an influential scholar. Cobb tracked down Cruse at a retirement home in Ann Arbor, Michigan, and obtained permission to organize and edit Cruse's writings and publish them in book form. The result, The Essential Harold Cruse: A Reader, edited by Cobb with a foreword by Stanley Crouch, was published in 2002; it was listed as a 2002 Notable Book of The Year by Black Issues Book Review. It enhanced Cobb's stature among the African-American Studies community.

Cobb has authored several books, including a scholarly monograph based on his doctoral thesis titled Antidote to Revolution: African American Anticommunism and the Struggle for Civil Rights, 1931–1957.

In 2003, Cobb wrote of the William Lynch speech, "it is absolutely fake".

Bibliography

Books

Essays and reporting
 
 
 
 
 
 
 
 
 
 
 
 
 
———————
Notes

References

External links
 
 

1969 births
Living people
African-American educators
Howard University alumni
Jamaica High School (New York City) alumni
Rutgers University alumni
Spelman College faculty
The New Yorker staff writers
University of Connecticut faculty
Writers from Queens, New York
Columbia University faculty